Lapis may refer to:

Geology
Lapis lazuli, a gemstone
Lapis armenus, a precious stone resembling lapis lazuli
Lapis Lacedaemonius, a form of andesite

Specific stones
Lapis Satricanus, a stone in the ruins of Satricum
Lapis philosophorum, a name for the philosopher's stone

Computing
Lapis (text editor), an experimental text editor with multiple simultaneous editing
 Lapis, an interactive art work by video game designer Heather Kelley

Fictional characters
 Lapis, a character in the Kaze no Stigma light novel series
 Lapis, a character in the Rental Magica light novel series
 Lapis Lazuli, a character in the Land of the Lustrous manga series
 Lapis Lazuli, a character in the Steven Universe animated television series
 Lapis and Lazuli, characters in the Hamtaro anime television series
 Androids 17 and 18 (real names Lapis and Lazuli, respectively), characters in the Dragon Ball manga series

Other uses
 Lapis, trade name for a preparation of silver nitrate against warts
 Lapis (magazine), Italian feminist magazine